Newark Opera House is a historic commercial building and opera house located at Newark in New Castle County, Delaware.  It was built in 1885 and is a four-story rectangular building with six bays at the north front facade.  The fourth story was added in 1907.  It features a mansard roof covered with patterned slate shingles in the Second Empire style.  Between about 1885 and 1925 it was the site of live theater and music, in addition to movies.

It was added to the National Register of Historic Places in 1982.

References

Theatres on the National Register of Historic Places in Delaware
Second Empire architecture in Delaware
Music venues completed in 1885
Buildings and structures in Newark, Delaware
National Register of Historic Places in New Castle County, Delaware
Opera houses on the National Register of Historic Places
Event venues on the National Register of Historic Places in Delaware
Opera houses in Delaware